Eugene Henry McCauliff (January 24, 1909 – August 13, 1984) was an American tennis player.

Based in Yonkers, McCauliff played collegiate tennis for Fordham University.

McCauliff was a four-time national indoor doubles champion and featured at Wimbledon in 1930. At the Mason & Dixon tournament in 1932 he had an upset win over U.S. Davis Cup player John Van Ryn. His best performance at the U.S. national championships was a third round appearance in 1933, which he almost repeated the next year, pushing number two seed Wilmer Allison to five sets in a second round match. Allison went on to make the final.

In 1940 he was married to wife Katherryn (nee Hernan).

References

External links
 

1909 births
1984 deaths
American male tennis players
Tennis people from New York (state)
Fordham Rams men's tennis players
Sportspeople from Yonkers, New York